David Kessler (born February 16, 1959) is an author, public speaker, and death and grieving expert. He has published many books, including two co-written with the psychiatrist Elisabeth Kübler-Ross: Life Lessons: Two Experts on Death and Dying Teach Us About the Mysteries of Life and Living, and On Grief & Grieving: Finding the Meaning of Grief Through the Five Stages of Grief. His first book, The Needs of the Dying, received praise from Mother Teresa and Marianne Williamson.

Biography
Kessler was born in Rhode Island. He did his undergraduate work at USC and graduate work at Loyola Marymount University in Bioethics. His mother died in 1973, an event that influenced his later work greatly. Now as a modern-day thanatologist he follows death wherever it may occur. Therefore, his work is a hybrid of several occupations, including working with the dying in hospitals and hospice, volunteering as a reserve officer on the police trauma team, and participating with the Red Cross on aviation disasters as well as its disaster team.

Career
Kessler concentrates in hospice, palliative care, grief and loss. His latest work includes interviews about afterlife, near death studies and near death awareness. He also is chairperson for the Hospital Association of Southern California Palliative Care Committee.
His experiences have taken him from Auschwitz concentration camp to Mother Teresa’s Home for the Dying Destitute in Calcutta. He also worked with Anthony Perkins, Michael Landon and industrialist Armand Hammer when they faced their own deaths.

Relationship with Elisabeth Kübler-Ross
Elisabeth Kübler-Ross, M.D., was a psychiatrist and the author of the book On Death and Dying. She was one of the world's foremost authorities on the psychology of dying and is credited with changing attitudes towards the terminally ill. In 1995 she suffered a series of major strokes, which left her paralyzed and facing her own death. It was during this time that she and David Kessler wrote their first book together, Life Lessons: Two Experts on Death and Dying Teach Us About the Mysteries of Life and Living.

Kübler-Ross died in 2004. Her last book, co-written with David Kessler, On Grief and Grieving, was completed one month before her death. David Kessler worked closely with Elisabeth for ten years and was with her as she was dying. He feels it is part of his mission to keep her work alive for the next generation.

Bibliography
 Finding Meaning: The Sixth Stage of Grief (Scribner 2019)
 Visions, Trips, and Crowded Rooms: Who and What You See Before You Die (Hay House 2010)
 With Elisabeth Kübler Ross, On Grief & Grieving: Finding the Meaning of Grief through the Five Stages of Loss (Simon & Schuster 2005)
Life Lessons: Two Experts on Death and Dying Teach us about the Mysteries of Life and Living (Simon & Schuster 2001)
 The Needs of the Dying: A Guide for Bringing Hope, Comfort, and Love to Life’s Final Chapter (HarperCollins 1997 and 2007)

References

External links
The Official David Kessler Website
The Official Oprah Website
The Tidings weekly Newspaper

Living people
1959 births
Writers from Rhode Island
American non-fiction writers